Margaret Craig  is a San Antonio-based American artist and printmaker who invented the Tar Gel™ Pressless Etching technique along with numerous other innovations. She holds a Master's in Painting from the University of Wisconsin-Madison, where she was introduced to etching by Frances Myers. She went on to study under Ken Little, Dennis Olsen and Kent Rush while working on her M.F.A. in Printmaking at the University of Texas at San Antonio. A degree in Biology influences numerous aspects of her work, which is exhibited in Texas, nationally in the USA, and internationally in Europe and Asia.

Currently  she is Chair of Printmaking at the Southwest School of Art in San Antonio, TX.

Artistic approach
Art Papers declared that "Margaret Craig has used the accidents and 'moments' of painting to explore the chaotic and whimsical." Informed by her biology degree and a healthy understanding of the experimental process, Craig synthesizes innovative techniques with the traditional from her painting and printmaking background, as well as other artistic disciplines.  "Craig is interested in the natural processes of growth and erosion. Experimentation often results in irregularities, and the unexpected results bring delight to both maker and beholder." New Art Examiner described the work as evoking "an intensity which extends beyond the nostalgia and irony of its components." "Craig's ability to allow the chance operations of natural processes helps her create her finished product, and the pure aesthetic pleasure that each of her works provokes is their main subject." Her pieces are very much tied to process, a slow evolution of layers that culminates in environments and creatures that could be swimming in a drop of rainwater or thriving in an alien ecology. Bennett said that some of Craig's pieces "offer panoramic views of beautifully barren otherworlds, as if Craig were able to photograph the surface of Jupiter."

Selected collections 
Margaret Craig's artwork is in the permanent collections of many museums, including:
Amity Foundation 
Brooklyn Art Library, Brooklyn, NY
Center for Book Arts, New York, NY
Chazen Museum of Art, Madison, WI
John Michael Kohler Arts Center, Sheboygan, WI
Judith K. and David J. Brodsky Center for Innovative Editions, Rutgers University, New Brunswick, NJ
Margaret Pace Willson
Museum of Texas Tech University, Artist Printmaker Teaching Collection, Lubbock, TX
North Dakota State University, Fargo, ND 
Southern Graphics Council 
St. Lawrence University, Canton, NY 
Turku Art Museum, Turku, Finland 
University of Colorado, Special Collection, Boulder, Colorado 
University of Miami, Coral Gables, Florida 
University of Texas, San Antonio, TX
Zayed University, Abu Dhabi, United Arab Emirates

Notes

References
Dustman, Emily and Ilan, Edison, Margaret Craig, E-Squared Magazine, pp 113–117, Autumn 2016. ISSN 2474-3984 
Cuba, Nan and Robinson, Riley, At our Doorstep, San Antonio Writers and Artists, Trinity University Press, San Antonio, TX, 2011. 
Craig, Margaret, Flexible Etching Getting, into the Groove, Central Booking Magazine, Brooklyn, NY, November 2011,pp 20–21.
Brenner, Wayne Alan Arts Review, The Austin Chronicle, Austin TX, Jun 10, 2011.
Silva, Elda Second Friday: Tobin Hill art walk adds 2 stops, My San Antonio, San Antonio Express News, Jul 14, 2009.
Cuba, Nan and Robinson, Riley, At our Doorstep, San Antonio Writers and Artists, Trinity University Press, San Antonio, TX, 2008. 
Owen, Paula, Multiple Views, Conversations on Prints and Printmaking, Artlies, Houston, TX, p. 56-58, Vol 46, Spring 2005.
Wellinghoff, Jasmina, Hot Art, San Antonio Woman, p 44-47, July / August 2003.
Allred, Okley, Margaret A Craig at RC Gallery, Voices of ART, San Antonio, TX, p 8, Vol. 11 Issue 2, 2003.
60 Second Egg, Egg The Art Show, San Antonio, TX, Nov 2001.
Daniel, Mike, San Antonio Abstract Painters, The Dallas Morning News, Dallas, TX, Apr 13, 2001.
Daughterty, Amy, ‘Bad Birds’ Artist Pays Homage to Feathered Outcasts, Bryan Eagle, College Station, TX. Mar 2,2000.
Schade, Christopher; Senses of Sensibility, Austin American Statesman, Austin, TX. Jul 4, 1998.

External links 
Margaret Craig Official site
Malleable Objects - Documentary video about Margaret Craig

20th-century American women artists
American women printmakers
20th-century American printmakers
1966 births
Living people
University of Wisconsin–Madison alumni
University of Texas at San Antonio alumni
21st-century American women artists
Artists from Texas
Artists from San Antonio